Holopodidae is a family of echinoderms belonging to the order Cyrtocrinida.

Genera:
 Cyathidium Steenstrup, 1847
 Holopus Orbigny, 1837

References

Cyrtocrinida
Echinoderm families